The Organized Crime and Corruption Reporting Project (OCCRP) is a global network of investigative journalists with staff on six continents. It was founded in 2006 and specializes in organized crime and corruption. It publishes its stories through local media and in English and Russian through its website. OCCRP works with and supports 50+ independent media outlets in Europe, Africa, the Caucasus, and Central Asia. In 2017, NGO Advisor ranked it 69th in the world in their annual list of the 500 best non-governmental organizations (NGO).

History
OCCRP was founded by veteran journalists Drew Sullivan and Paul Radu. Sullivan was serving as the editor of the Center for Investigative Reporting (CIR) and Radu worked with an early Romanian center. The team paired with colleagues in the region on a story looking at energy traders. The project showed traders were buying power at below production rates while the public was paying increasingly higher fees. In 2007 the project won the first ever Global Shining Light Award given out by the Global Investigative Journalism Network. It is a partner of the Arab Reporters for Investigative Journalism (ARIJ) in Jordan, Connectas in Colombia, the African Network of Centers for Investigative Reporting in South Africa, InsightCrime in Colombia, and the International Consortium of Investigative Journalists (ICIJ) in Washington. It has worked with hundreds of news organizations including The Guardian, Financial Times, Le Soir, the BBC, Time magazine, Al Jazeera and other major media.

Work

Investigations
The project has been involved in a number of high-profile investigations, including looking at the offshore services industry, organized crime ownership in football clubs, casinos and the security industry. In 2013, it broke new ground on the Magnitsky case, the largest tax fraud in Russian history, and demonstrated that funds stolen from the Russian treasury ended up in a company now owned by the son of Moscow's former transportation minister. Some of the money was used to buy high-end real estate near Wall Street. US prosecutors have since sought to seize $18 million in property from the company.

Working with SVT Swedish Television and the TT News Agency, it uncovered that the Swedish/Finnish Telecom giant TeliaSonera (now Telia), Vimpelcom and other phone companies had paid about $1 billion in bribes to companies controlled by Gulnara Karimova, daughter of Uzbekistan's president Islam Karimov. More than $800 million in assets were seized or frozen by law enforcement after the scandal. Vimpelcom paid a $775 million fine for their part in the bribes. The story won numerous international awards.

OCCRP worked on the Panama Papers project with the International Consortium of Investigative Journalists and Süddeutsche Zeitung producing more than 40 stories on corruption through the use of offshore entities including how friends close to Russian President Vladimir Putin were receiving large sums of money through offshore companies, how the President of Azerbaijan Ilham Aliyev owned a majority of his country's mining industry through offshore companies and how President Petro Poroshenko in Ukraine had violated Ukrainian law and avoided taxes using offshore companies.

It investigated an assassination attempt on a Russian banker which led the Moldovan government to ban the pro-Russian Patria political party from the 2014 elections and the party's leader to flee the country. It also looked at a massive money laundering scheme, the Russian Laundromat, that moved tens of billions of dollars into Europe using offshore companies, fake loans and bribed Moldovan judges. Some of the Russian banks involved were owned in part by Igor Putin, a cousin of Russian President Vladimir Putin. In March 2022, OCCRP was labeled as "undesirable organization" in Russia.

Its stories on Montenegro's long-time President and Prime Minister Milo Đukanović led to street demonstrations, calls for his removal and intense scrutiny by the European Union and NATO of its membership applications. Two series looked at the ties between Đukanović and organized crime. One series traced the President's family-owned bank, Prva Banka (First Bank), and how the president privatized it to his brother cheaply, moved massive state funds into the bank and then loaned the money out to his family, friends and organized crime on overly favorable terms. When the bank failed under the weight of these bad loans, the president bailed it out with taxpayer money. The Central Bank said the government lied about repaying the loan simply shuttling funds back and forth and claiming the loan was repaid. A second series examined how the president through his staff kept close relationships to international drug traffickers like Darko Saric, and that municipalities controlled by the president's party gave prime coastal property almost for free to Saric. It also showed how the Italian mafia was smuggling cigarettes to Italy from an island off the coast of Montenegro owned by his good friend Stanko Subotic and controlled by his head of security.

Drew Sullivan said that Philippines President Rodrigo Duterte "has made a mockery of rule of law in his country. While he is not your typical corrupt leader, he has empowered corruption in an innovative way. His death squads have allegedly focused on criminals but, in fact, are less discriminating. He has empowered a bully-run system of survival of the fiercest. In the end, the Philippines are more corrupt, more cruel, and less democratic."

In March 2022, in response to Russia's invasion of Ukraine, the project launched the Russian asset tracker to showcase the assets of the oligarchs and other influential Russians who have links to the Russian president Vladimir Putin.

In June 2022, company has revealed investigation on LLCInvest.

In February 2023, together with The Guardian and other publications, the OCCRP uncovered a vast disinformation campaign codenamed Team Jorge, organized by ex-Israeli special forces operative Tal Hanan, which is alleged to have conducted electoral meddling in more than 30 countries over the course of several years.

Person of the Year Award
Since 2012, OCCRP has dedicated the Person of the Year Award that "recognizes the individual or institution that has done the most to advance organized criminal activity and corruption in the world".

 2012 – Ilham Aliyev, President of Azerbaijan – Other mentions: Naser Kelmendi, Milo Đukanović, Vladimir Putin, Miroslav Mišković, Islam Karimov, Darko Šarić
 2013 – Parliament of Romania – Other mentions: Darko Šarić, Gulnara Karimova
 2014 – Vladimir Putin, President of the Russian Federation – Other mentions: Viktor Orbán, Milo Đukanović
 2015 – Milo Đukanović, Prime Minister of Montenegro – Other mentions: First Family of Azerbaijan, Nikola Gruevski
 2016 – Nicolás Maduro, President of Venezuela – Other mentions: Rodrigo Duterte, Bashar al-Assad, ISIL/ISIS, Raúl Castro/Luis Alberto Rodríguez, Vladimir Putin
 2017 – Rodrigo Duterte, President of the Philippines – Other mentions: Jacob Zuma, Robert Mugabe
 2018 – Danske Bank (as Actor of the Year, because it is a company, not a human), for the money laundering scandal – Other mentions: Vladimir Putin, Viktor Orbán, Mohammed bin Salman, Donald Trump
 2019 – Joseph Muscat, for the flourishing of criminality and corruption under his leadership as Prime Minister of Malta – Other mentions: Donald Trump, Rudy Giuliani, Denis-Christel Sassou Nguesso
 2020 – Jair Bolsonaro, President of Brazil, for "surrounding himself with corrupt figures, using propaganda to promote his populist agenda, undermining the justice system, and waging a destructive war against the Amazon region that has enriched some of the country’s worst land owners." – Other mentions: President of the United States Donald Trump, President of Turkey Recep Erdoğan, and Ihor Kolomoyskyi
 2021 – Alexander Lukashenko, President of Belarus, "in recognition of all he has done to advance organized criminal activity and corruption." – Other mentions: Former President of Afghanistan Ashraf Ghani, President of Syria Bashar al-Assad, President of Turkey Recep Tayyip Erdoğan, Former Chancellor of Austria Sebastian Kurz
 2022 – Yevgeny Prigozhin, a Russian oligarch and mercenary leader, "for his tireless efforts to “extend Russia's vicious and corrupt reach, to steal for Vladimir Putin, and to punish those who resist.”" – Other mentions: European Court of Justice, President of Turkey Recep Tayyip Erdoğan, President of Nicaragua Daniel Ortega

Daily Updates
The website of the organization provides daily updates about alleged instances of corruption and organized crime around the world, which reach 6 million readers every month.

OCCRP Aleph 
OCCRP Aleph is an investigative data platform containing an archive of government records and open databases. OCCRP grants access to journalists and activists on a case by case basis.

Luxembourg ultimate beneficial owner database
The UBO register does not allow search-by-owner-name, only company name or registration number. OCCRP received, from Le Monde, 3.3 million documents about 140,000 Luxembourg companies, scraped from the registry. Reporting about this are: 
 
Le Monde (France)
IrpiMedia (Investigative reporting project Italy) (Italy)
IStories.media (Russia)
Arab Reporters for Investigative Journalism (Middle East)
KRIK.rs (Serbia)
Bivol.bg (Bulgaria)
 (Czech Republic)
Süddeutsche Zeitung (Germany)
Le Soir (Belgium)
Woxx (Luxembourg)
McClatchy/Miami Herald/El Nuevo Herald (U.S.)
Revista Piauí (Brazil)
Tempo (Indonesia)
Armando.Info (Venezuela)
La Nacion (Argentina)
Inkyfada.com (Tunisia)
Infolibre.es (Spain)

Global Anti-Corruption Consortium 
The Global Anti-Corruption Consortium (GACC) is a partnership that brings together investigative reporting from the Organized Crime and Corruption Reporting Project (OCCRP) and advocacy driven by Transparency International (TI). TI uses evidence from OCCRP’s corruption investigations to inform and strengthen policy and legal advocacy. For example, OCCRP’s 2017 Azerbaijani Laundromat investigation revealed a US$2.9 billion money-laundering operation and slush fund run by Azerbaijan’s ruling elite. Run through four shell companies registered in the UK, with billions passing through Danske Bank – Denmark’s biggest bank – the laundered money was used to influence European politicians and representatives of international organizations, including delegates to the Parliamentary Assembly of the Council of Europe (PACE) — Europe’s most significant human rights body. TI rallied public pressure, presented European and national policymakers with evidence of reputation laundering and advocated for an independent investigation into allegations of corruption at the PACE. Resignations at the highest levels of the PACE followed almost immediately. A year later, PACE’s independent external investigation found numerous breaches of codes of conduct and, in some cases, corrupt activities.

Mission 
OCCRP's goal is to help people understand how organized crime and corruption resides in their countries and in their governments. The organization does not belong to any country, political philosophy or set of beliefs other than that all people should be allowed to choose their own governments and lead their own lives in safety, liberty and opportunity. Its reporters and editors come from dozens of countries.

OCCRP's mission statement says, "Our world is increasingly polarized. The world’s media channels are rife with propaganda, misinformation and simply wrong information. We must all strive to understand how our increasingly complex society works. We must be able to find the truth to make the kinds of decisions we need to. We are committed in our small way to telling the truth the best we can."

OCCRP has become one of the world's largest investigative reporting organizations, generating more than 120 cross-border investigations and stories per year. The OCCRP Network websites inform more than 6 million readers and viewers every month, and 200 million other readers and viewers have access through legacy media which publish its work. The ever-widening impact of OCCRP stories demonstrates that when enough people possess the right kind of information they can bring about the right kind of change.

The organization also trains reporters and partners in advanced journalism techniques, builds practical, high-use tools used to improve the efficiency of reporting and publishing and is actively reinventing investigative journalism to be more interactive, more effective, more impactful and relevant to readers.

Impact
In June 2022, OCCRP stated that since 2011 its actions had led to:

 US$7.5 billion in fines levied and assets seized by government agencies
 672 government actions
 211 civic actions
 111 corporate actions
 387 official investigations
 582 arrests, indictments, or sentences
 129 resignations or sackings of key figures, including a President, Prime Minister and CEOs of major international corporations

Organization and funding
Organized Crime and Corruption Reporting Project (OCCRP) is a registered name of the Journalism Development Network (JDN), a Maryland-based 501(c)(3) organization. OCCRP is governed by a board of directors: Marina Gorbis, David Boardman, Anders Alexanderson, Sue Gardner, Saska Cvetkovska, Drew Sullivan and Paul Radu.

OCCRP include the Center for Investigative Reporting (Bosnia and Herzegovina) (CIN) in Sarajevo, the RISE Project in Bucharest, the Centar za istraživačko novinarstvo - Serbia (CINS) in Belgrade, Investigative Journalists of Armenia (HETQ) in Yerevan, the Bulgarian Investigative Journalism Center in Sofia,  in Budapest, MANS in Montenegro, Re:Baltica in Riga, SCOOP-Macedonia in Skopje, Bivol.bg in Bulgaria,  in Ukraine, The Czech Center for Investigative Reporting in Prague and RISE Moldova in Chisinau among others. It is also partnered with Novaya Gazeta in Moscow and the Kyiv Post in Kyiv. New member centers were added to the OCCRP Network between 2015 and 2016, including the Investigative Reporting Project Italy (IRPI), Direkt36 in Hungary, Slidstvo.info in Ukraine, and DOSSIER in Austria.

OCCRP is supported by grants by the United States Agency for International Development (USAID), the International Center for Journalists (ICFJ), the United States Department of State, the Swiss Confederation, Google Ideas, Open Society Foundations (OSF) and the Knight Foundation.

Awards and recognition
OCCRP won the 2015 European Press Prize Special Award for its work, with the judges saying "the OCCRP is a memorably motivated, determined force for good everywhere it operates. Its members do not get rich, but the societies they serve are richer and cleaner for the scrutiny only true, independent journalism can provide."

It won the 2015 Investigative Reporters and Editors Tom Renner award for "The Khadija Project," an initiative to continue the work of imprisoned OCCRP/RFE reporter Khadija Ismayilova. It has been a finalist for three years running for the International Consortium of Investigative Journalists' Daniel Pearl Award for Outstanding International Investigative Reporting. It was a 2010 finalist for its project on the illegal document trade. It won the 2011 Daniel Pearl Award for its project "Offshore Crime, Inc.", a series of stories documenting offshore tax havens, the criminals who use them and millions of dollars in lost tax money. It was again a finalist in 2013 for its story about an international money laundering ring called the Proxy Platform. It won the Global Shining Light Award in 2008 for investigative reporting under duress for its series on energy traders. OCCRP was double finalist for the same award in 2013 for its stories on the first family of Montenegro's bank, "First Family, First Bank". It won the award for its stories on the first family of Azerbaijan's ownership of major companies in that country. It partnered with the International Consortium of Investigative Journalists for a project on tobacco smuggling that won the Overseas Press Club Award and Investigative Reporters and Editors's Tom Renner Award for crime reporting.

Controversy

Journalist Khadija Ismayilova
OCCRP and Radio Free Europe/Radio Liberty journalist Khadija Ismayilova, based in Baku, Azerbaijan was blackmailed by an unknown party with video captured in her bedroom using a camera installed in the wall. The camera was planted two days after OCCRP/RFERL published a story by Ismayilova about the presidential family in Azerbaijan and how it secretly owned Azerfon, a mobile phone company with a monopoly 3G license. A note  threatened to show the videos if Ismayilova did not "behave". She went public about the threats and the videos were shown on at least two websites. Ismayilova said that "the evidence shows that the government agencies were involved in the crime and prosecutor’s office fails to act as an independent investigative body".

After this incident, Ismayilova published articles showing that the first family also owned shares in six major goldfields and they owned one of the construction companies that built the new showcase Crystal Hall auditorium in Baku, the site of the 2012 Eurovision Song Contest. She was detained by state prosecutors in December 2014 on charges that she incited a fellow journalist to commit suicide by denying him a chance to return to his job at Radio Free Europe, despite the fact that she had no hiring authority. The journalist later retracted his statements on his Facebook page and attempted to flee to Moscow. The arrest was criticized around the world by dozens of governments, media and civil society organizations. In September 2015, Ismayilova was sentenced to 7.5 years in prison. Amal Clooney has been her lawyer.

OCCRP started the Khadija Project, an investigative reporting effort to continue Ismayilova's work. Editor Drew Sullivan, when initiating the project, said if governments arrest one investigative reporter, twenty would take their place. They vowed to look at the political elite in Azerbaijan and how they have materially benefited from their high positions. OCCRP did more than a dozen major investigations including some using the Panama Papers. OCCRP found the First Family of Azerbaijan had more than $140 million in high end London Property, owned a large percentage of the luxury hotel and banking businesses in Baku, had received more than $1 billion in bribes from telecom companies and other stories.

From 2016 to the present (2021), OCCRP's website has been permanently blocked in Azerbaijan by the Aliev regime, without any court decision.

In January 2019, the European Court of Human Rights ruled that the Azerbaijan government  failed to properly investigate a 2012 "sex video" and the subsequent threats of its public disclosure.

References

External links
 Organized Crime and Corruption Reporting Project
 Russian Asset Tracker

Investigative journalism
News agencies based in the United States
Online magazines published in the United States
Journalism organizations in Europe
Organizations established in 2006
Undesirable organizations in Russia